This article is a list of highways in the state of São Paulo:

CodificationRadial highways - The radial highways which are numbered 2 through 360 roughly correspond to the degree number from the state capital at the zero kilometre mark (São Paulo). One example is the SP-280.Transversal''' highways—They have the number related to the final mark of the kilometre from the capital that is at the end of each highway. One example is the SP-255, after the 255th kilometre of the highway which is 255 km from the state capital (from the zero kilometre mark).

Highways

SP-008 to SP-099

SP-101 to SP-197

SP-201 to SP-294

SP-300 to SP-387

SP-413 to SP-613

See also

Highway system of São Paulo
List of highways in Brazil

References

Highways in São Paulo (state)
Highways
Sao Paulo